The 'Indo' apple cultivar has been known since 1930. The fruit is very sweet.

References

External links
Apple University (りんご大学) 

Apple cultivars
Japanese apples